Lieutenant-Colonel Sir Peter Henry Clutterbuck  (28 September 1868 – 20 December 1951) was a British colonial civil servant and expert in forestry conservation, who worked as the Inspector General of Forests to the Government of India.

Early life
Clutterbuck was born in Great Stanmore, Middlesex. He was educated at Clifton College  and Bloxham School, followed by the Royal Indian Engineering College.

India
He was an officer in the Indian Auxiliary Force between 1887 and 1919. He became a civil servant in the Imperial Forestry Service, and worked in the Central Provinces (1889) and United Provinces (1890). From 1897 he was Deputy-Conservator of Forests, Eastern Circle, Upper Provinces. Awarded Kaisar-i-Hind Medal in 1911, Volunteer Officers' Decoration in 1912. Clutterbuck became Conservator of Forests of Eastern Provinces in 1913 and Upper Provinces in 1915. Commanded 8th Northern United Provinces Horse from 1917 to 1918.   He was invested as a Companion of the Order of the Indian Empire in 1918 and as a Commander of the Order of the British Empire in 1919.  From 1919 to 1920 he was a Member of Upper Provinces Legislative Council. Clutterbuck was made a knight bachelor in 1924. He was Inspector General of Forests to the Government of India. In 1926 Clutterbuck retired from IFS. From 1927-1932 he remained Chairman of Empire Forestry Association. He was delegate to 1928 Empire Forestry Conference in Australia and New Zealand. From 1933-1944 he served as Chief Conservator of Forests Jammu & Kashmir Forest Department-cum-Development Minister Jammu & Kashmir during Hari Singh's regime.

Family life
On 7 April 1896, he married Winifred Rose, daughter of Alfred Barrow Wilson Marriott. He died in the Bournemouth area on 20 December 1951, aged 83.

His son was Sir Alexander Clutterbuck, a British diplomat who was high commissioner to Canada and India and ambassador to Ireland.

Tributes
The locality of Clutterbuckganj near Bareilly, UP, India is named in his honour. It is often abbreviated to C.B. Ganj. It has a railway station.

References

1868 births
1951 deaths
British civil servants
British conservationists
Commanders of the Order of the British Empire
Companions of the Order of the Indian Empire
Fellows of the Royal Geographical Society
Imperial Forestry Service officers
Knights Bachelor
People educated at Bloxham School
People educated at Clifton College
Alumni of the Royal Indian Engineering College
British people in colonial India
Recipients of the Kaisar-i-Hind Medal